Qazmalar (also, Gazmalar) is a village and municipality in the Qakh District of Azerbaijan. It has a population of 249.

References 

Populated places in Qakh District